In European folklore, mandragoras are familiar demons who appear in the figures of little men without beards.

Mandragoras are thought to be little dolls or figures given to sorcerers by the Devil for the purpose of being consulted by them in time of need; and it would seem as if this conception had sprung directly from that of the fetish, which is nothing else than a dwelling-place made by a shaman or medicine-man for the reception of any wandering spirit who chooses to take up his abode therein.

See also 
 Mandrake
 Imp
 Golem
 Homunculus

References 

Demons